The following is the standings of the 2009–10 Futsal Super League season. Foolad Mahan are the defending champions.

Play-off 
After the Tam Iran Khodro withdrew from league, Football Association decided to hold a playoff game between the two teams that lost Promoted play-off in the 2008–09 1st Division.

League standings

Results table

Top goalscorers
34 Goals
  Vahid Shamsaei (Foolad Mahan)

31 Goals
  Morteza Azimaei (Rah)

25 Goals
  Mohammad Reza Zahmatkesh (Shahid Mansouri)

23 Goals
  Masoud Daneshvar (Sadra)
  Alireza Ghobeishavi (Melli Haffari)

22 Goals
  Ali Abdollahi
(Poushineh Baft)

21 Goals
  Mahmoud Lotfi (Rah)
  Shahram Sharifzadeh (Petroshimi)

Awards 

 Winner: Foolad Mahan
 Runners-up: Shahid Mansouri
 Third-Place: Melli Haffari
 Top scorer:  Vahid Shamsaei (Foolad Mahan) (34)

See also
 2009–10 Iran Futsal's 1st Division
 2010 Iran Futsal's 2nd Division
 2009–10 Persian Gulf Cup
 2009–10 Azadegan League
 2009–10 Iran Football's 2nd Division
 2009–10 Iran Football's 3rd Division
 2009–10 Hazfi Cup
 Iranian Super Cup

References

Futsal Planet 
Futsal News 
Iran cups 

Iranian Futsal Super League seasons
1